Tobo is a locality situated in Tierp Municipality, Uppsala County, Sweden with 595 inhabitants in 2018.

References 

Populated places in Uppsala County
Populated places in Tierp Municipality